Electric Fire is the name of the fourth solo album by Roger Taylor, from the band Queen. 

Electric fire can also refer to:

 Electric fireplace, an electric heater that mimics a fireplace burning coal, wood, or natural gas
 Electric fire, in British English any domestic heating appliance that uses electricity as fuel

See also
 Electrical fire, a fire involving potentially energized electrical equipment